Asas or ASAS may refer to:
 Asas language, a Rai Coast language spoken in Madang Province, Papua New Guinea
 Daily Asas, an Urdu-language newspaper published by the Asas Group of Newspapers
 All Sky Automated Survey, a star-survey project
 American Society of Animal Science, a livestock and meat science organisation
 Asas de Portugal, a flight demonstration team of the Portuguese Air Force
 Autonomous Soil Assessment System by Mission Control Space Services